The Extraordinary and Plenipotentiary Ambassador of Peru to the Republic of Kenya was the official representative of the Republic of Peru to the Republic of Kenya.

Peru and Kenya established relations in 1976, and Peru opened an embassy in Nairobi on October 30, 1987. Shortly after Alberto Fujimori was elected president in 1990, the embassy was closed on the same year.

As of 2023, the embassy of Peru in South Africa, which opened in 1994, is accredited to neighbouring countries and also "represents Peru in Sub-Saharan Africa."

List of representatives

References

Peru
Kenya